Kanak Jha (born June 19, 2000) is an American table tennis player of Indian descent. He is a two-time Olympian (2016 and 2020) and was the US national champion 4 times, winning the national title between 2016 and 2019 for a record four straight national titles.

Career

2016 
Jha competed at the 2016 Summer Olympics in the men's singles event and as part of the American team in the men's team event.

He was the youngest American athlete to participate in the 2016 Olympics and is also the first American born in the 2000s to qualify for the Olympics.

2018 
Jha also competed at the 2018 Summer Youth Olympics in the boy's event, in which he won a bronze medal. 2018 was somewhat of a breakout year for Jha, as he defeated several notable top players including Wong Chun Ting, Quadri Aruna, An Jaehyun, and Lin Yun-Ju.

2019 
Jha won his 4th straight US National title in 2019. Jha pulled off a bronze medal at the 2019 Pan American Games in mixed doubles and singles. In the 2019 World Team Cup, Jha defeated Anton Källberg and Kristian Karlsson to lead the US past Sweden out of the group stage.

2020 
Notable international wins for Jha in early 2020 include Uda Yukiya and Zhou Qihao. After the pandemic, Jha played in the 2020 World Cup, in which he lost in seven games to Liam Pitchford and deuce in the seventh to Chuang Chih-yuan, his favorite player growing up. In mid-2020, Jha signed with the German Bundesliga team in Ochsenhausen.

2021 
Jha was selected to represent the United States at the Tokyo Olympics in the men's singles and team event. He spent a large amount of his final days training in the United States with his Olympic teammate at the new 888 Table Tennis Center, a club for which he is an ambassador. Jha chose not to defend his US national title in July, opting instead to prepare for the Tokyo Olympics.

At the Tokyo Olympics, Jha lost 4-2 to Russia’s Kirill Skachkov in the round of 64. Team USA lost to Sweden in the first round of the team event, with Jha scoring USA's lone victory over Mattias Falck.

References

2000 births
Living people
American male table tennis players
Olympic table tennis players of the United States
Table tennis players at the 2016 Summer Olympics
Table tennis players at the 2018 Summer Youth Olympics
Table tennis players at the 2019 Pan American Games
Table tennis players at the 2020 Summer Olympics
Pan American Games medalists in table tennis
Pan American Games gold medalists for the United States
Pan American Games bronze medalists for the United States
Table tennis players at the 2015 Pan American Games
Medalists at the 2019 Pan American Games
American sportspeople of Indian descent
21st-century American people